Sandeep Reddy Vanga is an Indian director and screenwriter who is known for making Telugu and Hindi films. Vanga debuted with Vijay Deverakonda starrer 2017 big Telugu hit Arjun Reddy and rose to further success with its remake, the Shahid Kapoor starrer 2019 Hindi film Kabir Singh, that ranks among the highest grossing Hindi films of all time.

Early life 
Sandeep Reddy Vanga was born in Warangal, Telangana to Prabhakar Reddy and Sujatha. He has an elder brother, Pranay Reddy Vanga, who has produced the film Arjun Reddy. He did his schooling from Platinum Jubilee High School, Warangal till 8th standard and then moved to Hyderabad to continue from 9th standard to 12th standard. He received his bachelor's degree from SDM College of Physiotherapy, Dharwad.

After joining as an apprentice in Vizag, Vanga went to pursue at International Film School, Sydney (now known as AFTT – Academy of Film, Theatre & Television), Australia.

Career

2005–2012: Early career 
Vanga worked as an apprentice for the film Manasu Maata Vinadhu in 2005 for 25 days at Rushikonda Beach, Vizag. He worked for a few Tollywood films, including Kedi (2010) as an assistant director with Kiran Kumar and Malli Malli Idi Rani Roju (2015) as associate director with Kranthi Madhav. He started writing the script for Sugar Factory for his directorial debut, but shelved it and started working for Arjun Reddy.

2013–2017: Directorial debut 
Vanga started writing the script for Arjun Reddy in 2013 and finished it in few years. Producer Swapna Dutt and actor Sharwanand showed interest to work in the film, however it didn't pan out, as Sharwaand had multiple projects in the queue at that time. He was introduced to Vijay Deverakonda by a common friend. He cast him as the lead for his directorial debut Arjun Reddy. The film was released on 25 August 2017 and became a blockbuster hit with rave reviews. The film, produced on a budget of ₹4-5 crores, went on to gross more than ₹50 crores (US$8 million) at the box office. The film ran into trouble with the censor board for its depiction of smoking and narcotic drug use. It also created a furor for its kissing scenes and also for a movie poster which was approved by Telangana Film Chamber. Senior Congressman and Telangana Political Leader, V. Hanumantha Rao raged over the positioning of this Matured film to the audience. He went on to roads peeling off posters and stickers of the film promoting audience not to encourage such violent films.

2018–present: Recent work 
The next year, Vanga made a cameo appearance as Vedantam Raghavayya in the biographical film Mahanati. The same year, it was confirmed that Vanga himself will be directing the Hindi version of Arjun Reddy titled as Kabir Singh. He signed up Shahid Kapoor as lead. Kiara Advani was roped for playing the female lead. The film was produced by Murad Khetani and Ashwin Warde and the rights to the original film were purchased for 15 million. The filming began in July 2018 and the movie was released on 21 June 2019 and became a major blockbuster success at the box office earning over 379 crores Worldwide and over 278 crores net domestically in India thus being part of the 200 crore club. 

In January 2021, Vanga's next directorial, Animal, a gangster drama starring Ranbir Kapoor, Anil Kapoor, Rashmika Mandanna, and Bobby Deol was announced. It is produced by T-Series, Bhadrakhali Pictures, and Cine1Studios. His next directorial, Spirit, was announced in 2021 October. It will be starring Prabhas, in his 25th film, and produced jointly by T-Series and Bhadrakali Pictures.

Personal life 
Vanga married Manisha in 2014. The couple has a son, who was named after the film, Arjun Reddy and a daughter.

Filmography 

Acting roles
Mahanati (2018) – Vedantam Raghavayya

Accolades

References 

1985 births
Living people
Film directors from Telangana
Telugu film directors
South Indian International Movie Awards winners
Male actors in Telugu cinema
21st-century Indian film directors
People from Warangal
Telugu male actors
Telugu screenwriters
Screenwriters from Telangana